Peñalba de los Cilleros (Astur-Leonese: Penalba) is a locality located in the municipality of Cabrillanes, in León province, Castile and León, Spain. As of 2020, it has a population of 50.

Geography 
Peñalba de los Cilleros is located 88km northwest of León, Spain.

References

Populated places in the Province of León